Huldreslottet Mountain is a prominent ice-free mountain that is the southernmost summit in the Borg Massif, Queen Maud Land, Antarctica. It was mapped by Norwegian cartographers from surveys and air photos by the Norwegian–British–Swedish Antarctic Expedition (1949–52) and named Huldreslottet (the fairy castle).

See also
Vindegga Ridge

References

Mountains of Queen Maud Land
Princess Martha Coast